Vesperus  barredai is a species of beetle in the Vesperidae family that can be found in Portugal and Spain. Its colour is black, and it has yellow legs and antennae.

References

Vesperidae
Beetles described in 2009
Beetles of Europe